Koanophyllon palmeri, called Palmer’s umbrella thoroughwort, is a North American plant species in the family Asteraceae. It is native to Arizona, southwestern  New Mexico, and western Mexico from Sonora as far south as Michoacán.

Koanophyllon palmeri is an herb or subshrub up to 100 cm (39 inches) in height. Leaves are lanceolate with rounded bases and narrow pointed tips. Flowers are usually white, but sometimes tinged with purple or yellow.

References

palmeri
Flora of the Southwestern United States
Flora of Mexico
Plants described in 1852